Thelonious Alone in San Francisco is jazz pianist Thelonious Monk's third solo album, recorded in 1959. (Piano Solo, aka Solo 1954, recorded in Paris, and Thelonious Himself (1957), were Monk's previous forays into this form.)

It was recorded in Fugazi Hall, San Francisco, California, on October 21 and 22, 1959, but without an audience present.

"Bluehawk" and "Round Lights" were improvised blues which appeared only in these recorded versions. The other Monk compositions had appeared in prior recordings.

Track listing
All songs by Thelonious Monk, unless otherwise indicated.

Side One
"Blue Monk" - 3:44
"Ruby, My Dear" - 3:56
"Round Lights" - 3:34
"Everything Happens to Me" (Tom Adair, Matt Dennis) - 5:37
"You Took the Words Right Out of My Heart" (Ralph Rainger, Leo Robin) - 4:01

Side Two
"Bluehawk" - 3:37
"Pannonica" - 3:51
"Remember" (Irving Berlin) - 2:41
"There's Danger in Your Eyes, Cherie" (Jack Meskill, Harry Richman, Pete Wendling) - 4:18
"Reflections"- 5:06

Personnel
Thelonious Monk – piano
Technical
Reice Hamel - recording engineer

References

Albums produced by Orrin Keepnews
Solo piano jazz albums
Thelonious Monk albums
1959 albums